RETNA (born Marquis Lewis 1979) is a contemporary artist, primarily recognized for graffiti art. He was born and raised in Los Angeles, California, and started his career in the early 1990s. He developed a distinctive constructed script which is derived from Blackletter, Egyptian Hieroglyphics, Arabic, and Hebrew calligraphy, as well as more traditional types of street-based graffiti. In addition to exhibiting at institutions and galleries in Los Angeles, Miami, London, New York and Hong Kong, Retna has done advertising work for brands such as VistaJet, Louis Vuitton, and Nike. His artwork adorns the cover of Justin Bieber's Purpose album that debuted in 2015. Retna has many high profile patrons, including fast food magnate Sam Nazarian.

Career 
His hieroglyphic style artwork has also been seen in the Lower East Side on the Rivington Street Wall near Bowery.

Museum projects

 2013: RETNA: Para mi gente. Artist was invited to create art installation inside Museum of Contemporary Art, Los Angeles, CA.

Public projects

In 2016 he was commissioned to paint the side of the 24 story public housing building, Edificio Cuauhtémoc, in the Tlatelolco zone of Mexico City.

Selected solo exhibitions 
 2017: MARGRAVES, Maddox Gallery, London, UK
 2017: MANO A MANO, New Image Gallery, Los Angeles, CA

Controversy 

Retna has also repeatedly been in the news for violent acts, which have included: destroying artworks, an accusation of assaulting his ex-girlfriend Brittny Gastineau, and vandalizing a Los Angeles  gallery.

References

External links 

1979 births
Living people
American graffiti artists
Album-cover and concert-poster artists